Peixotto is a surname. Notable people with the surname include:

Becca Peixotto, American archaeologist
Benjamin F. Peixotto (1834–1890), American lawyer and diplomat
Daniel Levy Maduro Peixotto (1800–1843), Dutch-American physician
Edgar D. Peixotto (1867–1925), American lawyer
Ernest Peixotto (1869–1940), American artist, illustrator, and writer
Grace Peixotto (1817–1880), American brothel owner
Jessica Blanche Peixotto (1864–1941), Jewish-American educator and writer
Judith Salzedo Peixotto (1823–1881), Jewish-American teacher and principal
Raphael Peixotto (1837–1905), Jewish-American merchant